Backstreet Girls are a Norwegian rock band. Formed in 1984, they have released 16 albums.

History 
Backstreet Girls formed in 1984 and were influenced by the Ramones and Rose Tattoo.

The band was formed in 1984 by brothers Pål Kristensen on bass and Tom Kristensen on vocals. They were joined by guitarist Petter Baarli, formerly of the band Riff/Raff, and his brother, drummer Bjørn Terje Baarli.

In 1985 Tom Kristensen left the band, to be replaced by Arne Aarnes. Later that year they started writing and recording their first album, and also contributed to the Norwegian film X.

In 1986 they released their debut album Mental Shakedown on the small independent label Medicine Records. The album was released on a very limited press at first, but was re-released three years later on Polygram Records. Later that year Arne Aarnes left the band, and was replaced by Bjørn Müller of the band Z-off.

The line-up of Petter Baarli, Pål Kristensen, Bjørn Terje Baarli and Bjørn Müller remained for the subsequent three albums, Boogie Till' You Puke, Party On Elmstreet and Coming Down Hard.

In May 1991 Bjørn Müller left the band, and was replaced by the band's fourth vocalist, Ole Hillborg, formerly of Glorius Bankrobbers. The album Let's Have It was released in October 1992 on Warner Music.

In 1993 the band released a live album Live - Get Yer Yo-Yo's Out, and Ole Hillborg left the band shortly thereafter.

After this The Backstreet Girls went to England to hold auditions for another lead singer. They chose Irishman Pat Diamond, and returned to Norway to perform some concerts and record an album. The album  Don't Fake It Too Long was not released until 2008 .  However, Diamond was soon deported from Norway, and by 1995 Bjørn Müller had rejoined the band as lead vocalist.

In 1997 the 7" single "Monster In My Caddillac" was released on Hit!Me Records, but another album was not to appear until 1999, six years after the previous one, when the album Hellway To High was released on FaceFront Records.

In October 1999 bassist Pål Kristensen left the band to be replaced by Morten Lunde, of The Mormones.

In November 2000 Universal Records released a greatest hits compilation entitled Boogie Till' You Bleed.

In March 2001 the band released their eight studio album, Tuff Tuff Tuff, on FaceFront Records, and that summer went on a tour of Europe with Australian band Rose Tattoo, a long-time influence on the Backstreet Girls. Live recordings of these concerts were released in September 2002 on the album Black Boogie Death Rock N' Roll featuring six live recordings from the tour and six new songs.

At the end of 2002 Morten Lunde left the band to concentrate on his other band, The Mormones, and Dan Thunderbird was recruited on bass.

In 2003 the band recorded another album in between touring. The album was released in June on Facefront Records, entitled Sick My Duck. The band embarked on a Norwegian tour of over 20 dates called "Boogie My Life Away Tour".

A documentary on the band - "Backstreet Girls: Back to Muoatathal" was produced in 2015.

Members

Current members 
 Jonas Amazonas (drums)  2021 present
 Petter Baarli (guitar)
 Bjørn Müller (vocals) 1986–1991, 1995–present
 Gaute Vaag (bass guitar) 2019–present

Past members 
 Tom Kristensen (vocals) 1984–1985
 Pål Kristensen (bass guitar) 1984–1999
 Arne Aarnes (vocals) 1985–1987
 Olle Hillborg (vocals) 1992–1993
 Pat Diamond (vocals) 1994
 Morten Lunde (bass guitar) 1999–2002
 Stein Ramberg (guitar)
 Jon Berg (guitar)
 Anders Kronberg (vocals)
 Bjørn Terje Baarli (drums) 1984–2007
 Martin H-Son (drums) 2007–2018
 Dan Thunderbird (bass guitar) 2002–2019
 Frank Albin Tostrup (drums) 2018–2020

Discography 
 Mental Shakedown (1986)
 Boogie Till You Puke (1988)
 Party on Elm Street (1989)
 Coming Down Hard (1990)
 Let's Have It (1992)
 Live - Get Yer Yo-Yo's Out (1993)
 Hellway to High (1999)
 Boogie Till' You Bleed (2000) - Compilation
 Tuff Tuff Tuff (2001)
 Black Boogie Death Rock n' Roll (2002)
 Sick My Duck (2003)
 Shake Your Stimulator (2007)
 Don't Fake It Too Long (2008) - Vinyl only. Recorded in 1994.
 Just When You Thought Things Couldn't Get Any Worse... Here's the Backstreet Girls (2009)
 Death Before Compromise" (2014)
 Don't Mess with My Rock'n'Roll (2017)
 Normal Is Dangerous'' (2019)

References

External links
 Official Site

Norwegian rock music groups
Norwegian punk rock groups
Norwegian hard rock musical groups
Norwegian blues musical groups
Norwegian blues rock musical groups
Musical groups established in 1984
1984 establishments in Norway
Musical groups from Oslo